Pounder is a surname, and may refer to:
 Rafton Pounder (1933-1991), Irish politician
 Living people:
 C. C. H. Pounder (born 1952), Guyanese-American actor
 Cheryl Pounder (born 1976), Canadian ice hockey player
 Roy Pounder (fl. 21st century), British medical doctor
 Tony Pounder (born 1966), English footballer